The white-rumped robin (Peneothello bimaculata) is a species of bird in the family Petroicidae. It is found in New Guinea. Its natural habitats are subtropical or tropical moist lowland forests and subtropical or tropical moist montane forests.

Described by Italian naturalist, Tommaso Salvadori, in 1874, the white-rumped robin is a member of the Australasian robin family Petroicidae. Sibley and Ahlquist's DNA-DNA hybridisation studies placed this group in a Corvida parvorder comprising many tropical and Australian passerines, including pardalotes, fairy-wrens, and honeyeaters, as well as crows. However, subsequent molecular research (and current consensus) places the robins as a very early offshoot of the Passerida (or "advanced" songbirds) within the songbird lineage.

Within the species, two subspecies are recognised: the nominate subspecies, which is found on the southern side of the main mountain range along New Guinea, and the subspecies vicarius of the Huon Peninsula and Adelbert Range.

Description
Measuring , the white-rumped robin has black plumage with a white rump and upper tail coverts. It has white patches on the sides of its breast. The abdomen is white in the nominate subspecies, and black with some white in the subspecies vicarius. The female closely resembles the male, but its black feathers have brown tinges. The bill and feet are black, and the eyes are dark brown.

Distribution and habitat
Within the rainforest it is found in pairs in the understory or on the ground. It is insectivorous.

References

white-rumped robin
white-rumped robin
Taxonomy articles created by Polbot